Samik Lahiri (born 27 January 1967) is an Indian politician.  He is a senior member of the Communist Party of India (Marxist) of West Bengal. Lahiri was a member of the 11th to 14th Lok Sabha of India, representing the Diamond Harbour constituency of West Bengal.

External links
 Official biographical sketch in Parliament of India website

1967 births
Living people
Communist Party of India (Marxist) politicians from West Bengal
People from South 24 Parganas district
India MPs 2004–2009
Lok Sabha members from West Bengal
People from Purnia
India MPs 1996–1997
India MPs 1998–1999
India MPs 1999–2004